Peter of Vaux de Cernay (died c.1218) was a Cistercian monk of Vaux-de-Cernay Abbey, in what is now Yvelines, northern France, and a chronicler of the Albigensian Crusade. His Historia Albigensis is one of the primary sources for the events of that crusade.

The chronicle is thought to have been written from 1212 to 1218, recounting  events which were principally those of 1203 to 1208, but also later events, at some of which Peter himself was present as eyewitness. His uncle Guy of Vaux-de-Cernay was his abbot, bishop of Carcassonne for some years from 1212, and a preacher brought in earlier to preach against Catharism by Simon de Montfort, 5th Earl of Leicester. 

Peter had also followed the early Fourth Crusade, with Guy, as far as Zara, Dalmatia. They joined Simon perhaps in 1210, and Peter likely knew Simon personally. 

His writing is generally considered partisan, taking the Catholic side, but also to be more objective in reporting Cathar beliefs and actions than some of the hunters of heresy. Steven Runciman gives examples in which Peter's discussion of Cathar theology is presumably accurate, or, exaggerated for propaganda effect. The chronicle was not written after 1218, and it is suggested that Peter’s death shortly after that year may be the reason.

References
Pascal Guébin and Ernest Lyon (1939), Petri Vallium Sarnaii monachi Hystoria albigensis 
Pascal Guébin and Henri Maisonneuve (1951), Histoire albigeoise (three volumes)
W. A. Sibly and M. D. Sibly, History of the Albigensian Crusade: Peter of les Vaux-de-Cernay's 'Historia Albigensis''' (1998)
C. M. Kurpiewski, Writing beneath the shadow of heresy: the Historia Albigensis of Brother Pierre des Vaux-de-Cernay'', Journal of Medieval History 31 (2005), 1, pp. 1–27,

Notes

External links
Siege of Termes (1210), from the Siblys' translation of chapter 7 of Historia Albigensis
Petrus Vallis Caernaii (PVC) - Historia Albigensium etc. in Migne's Patrologia Latina in Latin.
 

13th-century French historians
French Cistercians
French chroniclers
French Christian monks
Christians of the Fourth Crusade
People of the Albigensian Crusade